Thomas Morrissey (born 29 May 1996) is an Irish hurler who plays as a left wing-forward for club side Ahane and at inter-county level with the Limerick senior hurling team.

Early life

Morrissey was born in Castleconnell, County Limerick. His brother, Dan Morrissey, also plays for Ahane and the Limerick senior hurling team.

Playing career

University

During his studies at the University of Limerick, Morrissey was selected for the college's senior hurling team. On 24 February 2018, he won a Fitzgibbon Cup medal following UL's 2-21 to 2-15 defeat of Dublin City University in the final.

Club

Morrissey joined the Ahane club at a young age and played in all grades at juvenile and underage levels, winning a championship medal in the minor grade in 2014. He later joined the club's senior team.

Inter-county

Minor and under-21

Morrissey first played for the Limerick minor hurling team at the age of seventeen. On 23 July 2013, he scored three points from play when Limerick won their first Munster Championship title in 29 years after a 1-20 to 4-08 defeat of Waterford in a replay of the final.

Morrissey was eligible for the minor grade again the following year and won a second successive Munster Championship medal after a 0-24 to 0-18 second successive defeat of Waterford in a replay of the final. On 7 September 2014, Morrissey was at full-forward for Limerick's 2-17 to 0-19 defeat by Kilkenny in the All-Ireland final.

Morrissey subsequently joined the Limerick under-21 hurling team and won a Munster Championship medal in his first season after a 0-22 to 0-19 win over Clare in the final. On 12 September 2015, Morrissey was at full-forward when Limerick defeated Wexford by 0-26 to 1-07 in the All-Ireland final. He ended the season by being named on the Bord Gáis Energy Team of the Year.

After surrendering their title in 2016, Morrissey won a second Munster Championship medal as captain the following year after a 0-16 to 1-11 defeat of Cork in the final. On 9 September 2017, Morrissey captained Limerick to a 0-17 to 0-11 defeat of Kilkenny in the All-Ireland final.

Senior

Morrissey was added to the Limerick senior hurling panel in advance of the 2015 season. He made his senior debut for Limerick on 14 February 2015, replacing Niall Moran in the 47th minute of a National Hurling League draw with Waterford at the Gaelic Grounds.

On 19 August 2018, Morrissey was at left wing-forward when Limerick won their first All-Ireland title in 45 years after a 3-16 to 2-18 defeat of Galway in the final. Later that day he was named on The Sunday Game Team of the Year. Morrissey ended the season by being nominated for an All-Star Award.

On 31 March 2019, Morrissey was selected at left wing-forward for Limerick's National League final meeting with Waterford at Croke Park. He collected a winners' medal after scoring a point from play in the 1-24 to 0-19 victory. On 30 June 2019, Morrissey won a Munster Championship medal after scoring four points from left wing-forward in Limerick's 2-26 to 2-14 defeat of Tipperary in the final.

Career statistics

Honours

 Ahane
Limerick Minor Hurling Championship (1): 2014

Limerick
All-Ireland Senior Hurling Championship (4): 2018, 2020, 2021, 2022
Munster Senior Hurling Championship (4): 2019, 2020, 2021, 2022
National Hurling League (2): 2019, 2020
 Waterford Crystal Cup (1): 2015
All-Ireland Under-21 Hurling Championship (2): 2015, 2017 (c)
Munster Under-21 Hurling Championship (2): 2015, 2017 (c)
 Munster Minor Hurling Championship (2): 2013, 2014.

Awards
The Sunday Game Team of the Year (3): 2018, 2020, 2021
 GAA-GPA All-Star Award (1): 2020

References

1996 births
Living people
Ahane hurlers
Limerick inter-county hurlers
All Stars Awards winners (hurling)